Balthasar of Nassau-Wiesbaden-Idstein (1520 – 11 January 1568) was the youngest son of Count Philip I of Nassau-Wiesbaden-Idstein and his wife, Adriana of Glymes of Bergen, the daughter of John III of Bergen op Zoom.

In 1566, Balthasar succeeded his elder brother Philip II as Count of Nassau-Wiesbaden and Nassau-Idstein.  However, he died only two years later.  He was succeeded by his son John Louis I.

In 1564, Balthasar married Margaret (1543-1612), the daughter of Reinhard of Isenburg-Birstein.  They had a son:
 John Louis I (1567-1596)
After Balthasar's death, Margaret married Count George I of Leiningen-Westerburg.

House of Nassau
Counts of Nassau
1520 births
1568 deaths
16th-century German people
Counts of Nassau-Wiesbaden-Idstein